The Irish Athletic Boxing Association Ltd. (IABA) is the national governing body for amateur boxing on the island of Ireland, developing and controlling the sport. Founded in 1911, the IABA operates from the National Stadium in Dublin, the only purpose built amateur boxing stadium in the world.

Structure
The Irish Athletic Boxing Association organises, develops, fosters and controls amateur boxing across Ireland (including Northern Ireland and the Republic of Ireland); it is the national governing body (NGB) for amateur boxing. Boxing clubs in Ireland are represented and supported at county, provincial and national level. Boxing clubs affiliate to the IABA and are then entitled to compete at each of these three levels.

The IABA has established six 'provincial councils' for Ulster, Leinster, Connacht, Munster, Antrim, and Dublin. Although Antrim and Dublin are not among the four traditional provinces of Ireland, separate councils were set up due to large volumes of boxing clubs in these two areas. Each county in Ireland is also represented by its own 'county board'.

History pre-1936
The association was originally called the Irish Amateur Boxing Association. It led a nomadic existence, holding events, tournaments and boxing shows at many different venues. With the popularity of amateur boxing surging amongst the working class population, it was decided that a headquarters for the IABA and amateur boxing was required.

National Stadium
In 1935, Dep.Commissioner WRE Murphy first proposed a boxing stadium. In 1937, the IABA proposed to construct a stadium solely for the purposes of boxing. The cost of building the National Stadium was over £12,000 (IEP), a considerable sum at the time. 
WRE Murphy kick started early fund raising with private athletic events.

In 1939, the National Stadium, located in Dublin, was completed and officially opened. WRE Murphy was recognized as the father of Irish boxing and earned 3 lifetime seats at the stadium. The stadium  was later renovated and modernised in 2000.

The National Stadium is the only purpose built boxing stadium in the world. The Stadium is still managed by the IABA and has been in use for national and international boxing events ever since its official opening. The High Performance Unit is based at the National Sports Campus in Abbotstown, Dublin 12.

The IABA changed its company name from Irish Amateur Boxing Association to Irish Athletic Boxing Association (IABA) in January 2016, following a directive issued by AIBA, the international governing body, to all National Boxing Federations to remove the word 'Amateur' from the name of each individual Federation.

Olympic success
Michael Carruth, Katie Taylor, and Kellie Harrington are the only Irish boxers to win a gold medal in the sport. Michael Carruth won gold at the 1992 Barcelona Olympics, and exactly 20 years to the week later, Katie Taylor won gold at the London 2012 Olympics. She was the first Irish woman to qualify and compete in an Olympic boxing event.  Taylor won her Olympic debut over Great Britain's Natasha Jonas with a 26–15 score. An International Olympic Committee official said that the decibels hit 113.7 – the highest crowd levels recorded at London 2012 so far. Paddy Barnes made history in 2012 by being the first Irish boxer to ever win two Olympic Medals at two consecutive Olympics – only two Irish athletes have managed this. The team that represented Irish boxing at the London 2012 Olympics has been the most successful IABA boxing Olympic Team since the 1956 Melbourne Olympics. The London 2012 team consisted of:

 Darren O'Neill 75 kg Paulstown BC (Team Captain)
 Adam Nolan 69 kg Bray BC
 Katie Taylor 60 kg Bray BC
 John Joe Nevin 56 kg Cavan BC
 Michael Conlan 52 kg St John Bosco Belfast BC
 Paddy Barnes 49 kg Holy Family Belfast BC

2016 Rio Olympics
In October 2015 the head coach of the IABA's High Performance Unit, Billy Walsh, left for the US to train the USA women's team. Although discussions on a new contract for Walsh had been on-going for several months, Walsh claimed the IABA "changed their stance on virtually every detail" of a new contract offer. The Irish Sports Council (Sport Ireland) publicly blamed the IABA for the loss of Walsh. The IABA, in return, refuted what it called the "disgraceful allegations" of Sports Ireland and claimed that Walsh left for financial reasons, and that Sports Ireland was using this loss to take control of the IABA's High Performance Unit.

Ireland's performance in the 2016 Rio Olympics boxing events was unsuccessful, with Ireland not featuring in any medal positions, despite having a number of seeded boxers. The USA women's team had its best performance ever.

Developments after 2016 Rio Olympics
In 2017 Sport Ireland published a review, the ‘Rio Review’, which said the boxing team's performance at the 2016 Games was not ‘a blip in an otherwise outstanding success story’ but the result of ‘underlying failings in the high performance programme.’ The 212-page review on Ireland's Olympic and Paralympic campaigns also said blaming the departure of head coach Billy Walsh, questionable judging decisions and a positive drugs test only masked ‘the real root causes.’ The Irish Athletic Boxing Association's (IABA) high performance funding for 2017 was cut by €200,000. Disagreements among senior members of the IABA has led to warnings from Sport Ireland that further steps will be taken against the IABA. 

Successful Irish boxer Bernard Dunne (13 Irish amateur championships and the WBA Super Bantamweight world title in 2009) was appointed director of the high-performance unit in April 2017. The IABA also announced that their High Performance Unit would move to the Sport Ireland National Sports Campus on a permanent basis following the completion of an agreement with the Sport Ireland Institute.

In the following month the feud both within the IABA and with Sport Ireland flared up again, with two people claiming to be the chairman of the IABA: Dublin barrister Joe Christle and Waterford's David O’Brien. O'Brien claimed that a meeting of the board of directors was held on 27 March, which Joe Christle did not attend. The IABA president Pat Ryan did attend. O'Brien claimed that he was voted in as the chairman of the board of directors, as Christle's time on the board had finished, and he (O'Brien) called for both Christle and the CEO of the IABA, Fergal Carruth, to step down. Christle, in turn, claimed that the vote taken at that meeting was invalid, as there were insufficient members present to form a quorum. Joe Christle was recognised by Sport Ireland, while five members of the board of directors approved David O’Brien as an alternative chairman, leading to deep divisions within the body.

On 7 June both the minister for sport, Patrick O'Donovan, and John Treacy, Sport Ireland chief executive, said they recognised Christle as chairman. They set a 30th of June deadline for the IABA to get its act together and introduce a new rule book, which would ensure the autonomy of the High Performance Unit and ensure Dunne's sole right to make team selections in keeping with recommendations made in the post-Olympic ‘Rio Review’. In response, the following day IABA president Ryan penned a strongly-worded letter to Christle, criticising many of Christle's recent decisions as well as outlining concerns in relation to the organisation's current leadership, among other issues.

One day later the IABA board of directors (a majority of whom supported Christle's position as chairman) published a statement replying to Pat Ryan's letter, which had been leaked.  The statement was posted on the IABA website.  The board members emphasised that they had received legal advice to support Christle's position as chairman. The board's statement also reiterated their intention to introduce a new IABA Rule Book as demanded by Sport Ireland.

IABA Olympic medals

See also
 Boxing Union of Ireland
 Ireland at the Olympics

References

External links
 

1911 establishments in Ireland
Ireland
Boxing, amateur
Boxing in Ireland
Amateur boxing organizations